Pavel Viktorovich Yesikov (born 29 January 1988) is a Russian professional football player.

Club career
He made his Russian Football National League debut for FC Volgar-Gazprom Astrakhan on 9 August 2009 in a game against FC Shinnik Yaroslavl.

External links
 

1988 births
Footballers from Moscow
Living people
Russian footballers
FC Volgar Astrakhan players
FC Chernomorets Novorossiysk players
FC Sakhalin Yuzhno-Sakhalinsk players
FC Dynamo Stavropol players
Association football forwards
FC Moscow players
FC Avangard Kursk players
FC Olimp-Dolgoprudny players